John Hawdon (1801—1881) was an English-born colonial settler of New South Wales. He is associated with the area around Moruya, particularly Kiora and Tuross Head, on the South Coast of New South Wales, Australia, although he was also a pioneering landholder of other areas of the colony.

Early life and family background 
Hawdon was born at Wackerfield (near Staindrop), Durham, England, prematurely, on 29 June 1801. His father was also named John and his mother was Elizabeth (née Hunt). His father, John Hawdon (1770—1845), was described as a 'yeoman', indicating that he came from a social stratum above a free-born labourer but was not a member of the gentry. As well as farming, Hawdons' father was an officer in the Staindrop Gentlemen and Yeomanry (later Staindrop Volunteer Cavalry), a volunteer force raised during the Napoleonic Wars; initially he was a second lieutenant, later rising to the rank of captain.

Hawdons' father's 520 acre farm was mainly used to breed and grow sheep. The land had in earlier times been owned by the Hawdon family, but was, by Hawdon's father's time, a part of the estate associated with Raby Castle. Hawdon was the eldest of three sons. His younger brother William Hawdon (1812-1879) stayed in England and later took over the running of the family farm.

Life in New South Wales

Migrant and landholder 
He arrived in Sydney aboard Caroline, on 12 September 1828, with his wife, and two sons, one newly-born at sea. The family came well prepared, bringing with them a piano and many animals including "eight dogs, about 40 sheep, pigs, and poultry in abundance, a cow, a goat with two kids". He also brought with him letters-of-introduction to prominent colonists including, Thomas Iceley, Rev. William Cowper, Rev. Samuel Marsden, and Dr. James Bowman (who was married to a daughter of John Macarthur and Elizabeth Macarthur).

The administration of Governor Ralph Darling saw the creation of many great fortunes that begun with land grants in the colony, to those that the Governor favoured, and the cheap labour of assigned convicts. What is most notable about Hawdon, among those favoured by Darling, was that he was not an ex-military man and actually had a background in agriculture. This distinction, together with his innate personal energy and optimism, probably explains, at least in part, why he would become so successful.

After arriving in the colony, he rented land at the Cowpastures, known as 'Elderslie', and quickly got to work. He wrote, "The Governor has been pleased at two dinner parties to express his sentiments of approbation on me, saying I had begun like one who is determined to do well, for I had not been eight days in the Colony before I had my ploughs going." 'Elderslie' grew hay, for fattening cattle, and also a small crop of tobacco. Hawdon already had a reputation as a good master of his assigned convicts; none of the convicts he had working at Elderslie were sent to the Cawdor Bench of Magistrates for punishment.

Hawdon was granted 2560 acres of land at Kiora, in 1831, and moved there from 'Elderslie', in 1832. Kiora lay on the northern side of the Moruya River, at the southern-most limit of the Nineteen Counties, in which settlement was allowed by the colonial government. He had a house built there, known as 'Kiora House'.  In the same year, 1832, as a squatter, he took up land at Howlong, on the Murray River, which he used for grazing cattle.

He worked his land at Kiora using assigned convict labour; at one time employing as many as 100, across various occupations, resulting in his remote estate being nearly self sufficient. He seems to have treated his assigned convicts, or 'government men', relatively well; probably as a result, he reported that he had little difficulty in managing them. Later, the blacksmith's forge, the mill, tailor's and shoemaker's shops, and the other trades that he brought to the district would be the nucleus of the town of Moruya.

Encouraged by Hawdon, who was enthusiastic and optimistic about prospects in the colony, his youngest brother Joseph Hawdon  (1813 – 1871) came to Australia in 1834. In conjunction with his younger brother, Hawdon contracted for the first overland mail service between Sydney and the new settlement at Melbourne, in 1837, using one of his stockmen, John Bourke, as the mailman. Bourke carried Joseph Hawdon's pair of dueling pistols as protection. It was from Hawdon's land at Howlong (then known, confusingly, as Oolong) that Joseph Hawdon and two other men—John Gardiner and John Hepburn—drove cattle overland, for the first time, to the new colony of South Australia, in 1836. Both Hawdon brothers were early members of the Melbourne Club.

It was Hawdon who wrote to the Governor in 1836, pointing out the dependence of the settlers on the safe anchorage and port at Broulee, leading to the surveying of a township there in 1837, by James Larmer.

Wanting more land, from 1836, Hawdon squatted on a huge piece of land south of the Moruya River, comprising the areas known today as Congo, Bergalia, Tuross Head and Bodalla. This squatting run was referred to as 'Bergalia'. In 1843, he established an outstation at Bodalla. In 1848, he was able to obtain a Crown Lease over 30,000 acres of land in the area, much of it prime land. A large portion of the Crown Lease, around Bodalla, later became part of the estate of Thomas Suttcliff Mort, although Hawdon retained some land near Tuross Head, 'Kyla Park', and the original land grant at Kiora.

In time, he would also own land near Mildura, and at Mount Greenock and Dandenong Creek, in the Port Phillip District, later the colony of Victoria.

Relations with traditional owners 
At the time Hawdon was 'taking up' land, the traditional owners of that land were still occupying it. It was the granting of title deeds for the land, to settlers such as Hawdon, that was extinguishing what was later known as native title over that land.

Hawdon seems to have enjoyed friendly relations with the local people. While living at 'Eldersie', he would lend them guns, powder and shot, repaid by the local people with half of the game that they had shot. He praised the friendliness and strict honesty of the local people around Camden, and noted their excellent memories, although—unsurprisingly perhaps for a man noted for his energetic disposition and with the prejudices of the time—he thought that they were 'excessively idle.'

Once Hawdon moved to Kiora, the settlers were living close by the local Yuin people. Local people, having heard Hawdon calling his wife "My dear", also did so, believing that was her true name. Hawdon's barnyard at Kiora was the scene of an inter-communal battle between local 'Moruya' men and 'Braidwood' men, probably both different groups of Yuin. Although the settlers inside the house were frightened by the fighting, they were not involved. The 'Braidwood' men retreated, leaving two wounded in the yard.

It was local Yuin people, around Moruya, who showed Hawdon the rich well-watered land around Bodalla. It is unlikely that they understood the huge consequences of the Crown Lease that he later obtained over the land, effectively dispossessing Yuin people occupying that land. Hawdon had a brass breastplate made for a Yuin man, Paddy Nurrang, 'King of Bergalia'.

For many years, he employed at least three Aboriginal men as servants—'Mister Campbell', the coach-driver, dressed in black livery, 'Mister Walker', and 'Benson'. It was as if he was recreating an English manor, on the verges of what was, in the eyes of his contemporaries, still a wilderness.

Colonial magistrate 
As an early and prominent settler of a remote area, Hawdon became a local magistrate. In the days before Moruya was established, the magistrates sat at nearby Broulee.

Hawdon was not comfortable sentencing escaped convicts; when recaptured, their punishment would be flogging. His attitude was unusual for the colonial magistrates of the time, many of whom—particularly the ex-military officers—seemed unrestrained in handing down harsh sentences. His daughter recalled that, if he suspected the presence of any absconding convicts, he would loudly announce that he would return later, at a particular time, to make a thorough search, allowing them time to slip away discreetly.

Although he was a magistrate, he was also involved in legal cases, in the role of defendant. In October 1840, he lost a civil action and had to pay damages for slander.

On 30 January 1844, Hawdon entered the bar of the hotel at Broulee, on horseback. Assisted by three other men—Hawdon's brother-in-law, Mr Potts, another local magistrate , Mr Wason (from Ulladulla), and the Clerk-of-the-Bench, Mr McLean—Hawdon attacked William Oldrey's former superintendent, Richard Bingham Sheridan.  The alleged assault could not be properly investigated nor tried, at Broulee, as the accused, Hawdon, was one of the two local magistrates, and the next closest bench, at Braidwood, refused to become involved. Sheridan doggedly persisted in seeking justice, and Hawdon was eventually tried—giving evidence by affidavit—and found guilty, by a jury, in the Supreme Court, nearly a year later. He was fined £100, and gave security of £500 and two sureties of £250 each, "to keep the peace for twelve months." The strange episode —out of character for Hawdon—appears to have been triggered by an argument, about money, between Oldrey and Sheridan at 'Mount Oldrey', earlier on the same day as the assault. There is some indication that alcohol was a factor.  It seems that Hawdon was no longer working as a magistrate thereafter.

Family, later life, and death 
He married Margaret Katherine Potts (1809–1886) at St Peter's Walls End, Northumberland (later Wallsend, Newcastle upon Tyne), in England. They had eight children; John (1827—1848), the only child born in England, Gilbert (1828—1863), who was born at sea, William (1832—1915), Ernest Werge (1834—1892), Joseph (1836—1859), Francis (1838—1919), Elizabeth Anne (1842—1890), and Annie (1844—1941). His first two sons were early students at The King's School, but the younger sons attended Sydney Grammar School.

Hawdon's  mother-in-law, Margaret Potts née Werge (1771—1862) followed her only daughter to Australia. His younger brother, Joseph Hawdon (1813—1871), became a pioneering settler of the colony of Victoria, then returned to England, before emigrating once again to the South Island of New Zealand.

Hawdon lived out his last years, in retirement, on his two South Coast landholdings, which after the years of convict assigned labour were used mainly for dairy farming.

In early 1876, he presided, as a highly-regarded 'venerable pioneer', over a dinner at Moruya that was held to celebrate the opening of the first bridge across the Moruya River. He remembered, "when the river bore on its bosom nothing but the canoe of the aboriginal; and its banks had not heard the sound of the bushman's axe, or that of the stockman's whip". He lived in a world transformed irrevocably, especially for the dispossessed Yuin people, in just over four decades of his lifetime.

Hawdon's younger brother, William, had taken over the running of the family farm in England upon his father's death in 1845. William's two surviving sons did not follow him into farming. William died in 1879 and, about this time, Hawdon made a visit to England, possibly to wind up the family's farming interests there. He returned to New South Wales in 1880, thereby severing a family connection to the area around Wackerfield that reportedly dated from the Elizabethan era.

Hawdon died at Kiora, near Moruya, on 12 June 1881. His wife died on 28 October 1886, in Moruya. They lie in the old Kiora (private) cemetery, with five of their children. His eldest son John lies, far away, in Mildura, one of the first settlers to be buried there.

Legacy 
Hawdon's letters are held in the collection of the State Library of New South Wales. His long-lived youngest daughter Annie Wilson, was able to recollect details of life in the early times, which were reported in the early 20th-century.

Hawdon Street and Hawdon Place in the Canberra suburb of Downer, are named after both Hawdon and his brother Joseph Hawdon.

His most lasting legacies are the townships of Moruya and Broulee. Although he founded neither in person, he did much that led to their establishment. Hawdon Street in Moruya is named after him.

His property, near Tuross Head, 'Kyla Park'—owned by Hawdon family descendants, until 1970—is remembered by the name of a street and a recreation reserve in Tuross Head. Some of the property itself has been developed for housing. A rural portion is preserved, for use as grazing land or for other semi-rural uses, under a local heritage management plan.

His other home, 'Kiora House', at Kiora, still stands. it has been described as “arguably the most sophisticated early house built in the region.” The words, “Annie Hawdon on 26th Feb 1865” that she scratched into a window pane of the house, with her diamond ring, at her wedding reception, still survive.

See also 

 Joseph Hawdon (younger brother)

References 

Settlers of New South Wales
1801 births
1881 deaths
19th-century squatters